Zavoli is an Italian surname. Notable people with the surname include:

Danilo Zavoli (born 1973), Sammarinese swimmer
Mimma Zavoli (born 1963), Sammarinese politician 
Sergio Zavoli (1923–2020), Italian politician and journalist

See also
Davoli (surname)

Italian-language surnames